"Broken Home" is a song by American rock band Papa Roach. It is the second single and third track from their second studio album, Infest. The song discusses family conflict and emotions in the aftermath of a divorce.

Background and meaning

Vocalist Jacoby Shaddix said that "Broken Home" was about his family "falling to pieces, pretty much, and being stuck in the middle of two parents... One of them was actually not ever there. I had a bed-wetting problem for a lot of years, and I had a problem with my father." He attributed this to his father's time in the military, noting, "When he was 18 or so, my biological father went to the Vietnam War to be a killer for the U.S. government, and it really put a tax on his life... That war set up a lot of broken homes."

Bassist Tobin Esperance added that "Jacoby chose lyrically to set the topic in divorce, which is something that everybody in the band has dealt with and kids all over deal with. It's another painful subject to bring up, but people just let loose when it came to that song." Esperance said that his parents divorced when he was six, leading to a distanced relationship: "My dad's cool, but I don't really know him that well... [Jacoby] didn't see his dad for, I think, 13 years."

Musical style
According to Esperance, the song "started out as a real funky kind of groove – a heavy guitar thing." He also noted the influence of alternative metal band Helmet: "I was playing that at rehearsal, and it reminded me of Helmet; we were really into this band, Helmet, from the East Coast, and the riff kind of reminded us of one of their songs. I don't remember the exact song. We all just started jamming on it".

Commercial performance
Although "Broken Home" had some popularity, it did not match the popularity of Papa Roach's debut single "Last Resort." "Broken Home" peaked at number nine on the Modern Rock Tracks chart and number 18 on the Mainstream Rock chart. The song was on the Modern Rock Tracks chart for 20 weeks and the Mainstream Rock chart for 19 weeks.

Critical reception
Chad Childers of Loudwire wrote that the song displayed Shaddix as "a master at baring his soul." Other reviews were less positive, citing a sense of immaturity; Sal Cinquemani of Slant called the track "painfully reductive" and Scott Seward of Spin wrote that it "[tried] to pick at teendom's boo-boos with Jonathan Davis' self-lacerating edge."

Music video

The music video for "Broken Home" was directed by Marcos Siega. Filmed in the middle-class neighborhood of Burbank, California, the video shows Papa Roach performing in a house. This performance is interspersed with clips of a child's life and his dysfunctional family, including the mother's substance abuse and the father's rape of her and his infidelity. The video ends with the band destroying various items inside the house.

The process of filming was difficult on the band and crew; both Shaddix and a production assistant suffered mental breakdowns, leading to the latter reportedly stealing a van and disappearing for two days. Siega said, "I wanted the actors to lose themselves in the roles... [The father] really forced himself on the woman playing the mom. I yelled 'cut' not to stop the action but to stop the actress from crying. It was difficult to watch." According to guitarist Jerry Horton, Siega (whose parents were also separated) broke into tears during filming. However, there was no animosity between the band and Siega following shooting, and they expressed their appreciation by presenting him with an autographed guitar.

The music video for "Broken Home" was regularly featured on MTV and it was nominated for the Short Form Music Video category at the 43rd Grammy Awards.

Track listing

Chart performance

Citations

Bibliography

External links
 

Papa Roach songs
2001 singles
2000 songs
Songs about marriage
Songs about divorce
Music videos directed by Marcos Siega
DreamWorks Records singles
Songs written by Jacoby Shaddix
Songs written by Tobin Esperance